Chen Gang (1906–1967) was a Chinese intelligence officer and a member of the Chinese Communist Party's security services.

Born in Fushun County, Sichuan province, Chen entered China University in Beijing in 1925 and joined the Chinese Communist Party (CCP) in January 1927. In 1935, he was sent by the party to Moscow, where he studied at the International Lenin School for two years.

Upon returning to China in 1937, he was assigned to work in Yan'an, where he participated in building up the security services and intelligence and counterintelligence organ of the CCP leadership and, during the Anti-Japanese War, worked as an officer in the Central Social Affairs Department (SAD). Chen led a contingent of some one hundred or more SAD officers to liberated Manchuria shortly after the end of World War II and remained active in that part of China until December 1948, when he was recalled to party central and appointed deputy director of the SAD. (One source claims that he had in fact been promoted to this post already when departing Yan'an for Manchuria in November 1945.) Chen was in Beiping (Beijing) in his SAD deputy director capacity until the summer of 1949. At this time, at his own request, he was transferred to his native province of Sichuan where, during the next decade and a half, he would hold a number of senior party positions in the industrial and labour sectors in, in addition to being a concurrent member of the CCP Central Supervisory Commission. Purged in the autumn of 1966, at the start of the Cultural Revolution, Chen was officially rehabilitated in May 1973.

References

 中共党史人物传 (Biographies of Persons in the History of the Chinese Communist Party), vol. 34. Xi'an: Shaanxi renmin chubanshe,  1987, pp. 208–229.

1906 births
1967 deaths
Chinese Communist Party politicians from Sichuan
Chinese spies
Delegates to the 7th National Congress of the Chinese Communist Party
People persecuted to death during the Cultural Revolution
People's Republic of China politicians from Sichuan
Politicians from Zigong